Bradina hemmingalis is a moth in the family Crambidae. It is found in the West Indies.

References

Moths described in 1924
Bradina